Stephen Ross Madsen (born 15 August 1992) is an Australian actor. He is best known for his role as Jason "J.D." Dean in the Australian production of Heathers: The Musical, and in 2017, he originated the role of Alexander Shkuratov in the musical Muriel's Wedding.

Early life and education
Madsen is the son of Sally, a doctor, and Ross, growing up in Mona Vale, New South Wales. As a child he attended Mona Vale Primary School and, later, Manly Selective Campus. Madsen graduated from the Western Australian Academy of Performing Arts in 2014.

Career
In 2015, Madsen appeared in a production of The Catalinas of Crawley Bay at His Majesty's Theatre, Perth on 29 April 2015. He later portrayed Jason "J.D." Dean in the premiere Australian production of Heathers: The Musical at the Hayes Theatre from 22 July until 9 August. Later in the year, he portrayed Mark Cohen in Rent, also at the Hayes Theatre, from 13 October until 1 November.

The following year, in 2016, Madsen returned to the role of Jason Dean in Heathers at the Queensland Performing Arts Centre's Playhouse. From 20 to 31 January, he portrayed Richard Loeb in the Chapel Off Chapel production of Thrill Me. Madsen returned to the role of J.D. in Melbourne and a return Sydney season, at the Arts Centre Melbourne Playhouse and Sydney Opera House Playhouse, respectively.

In 2017, Madsen appeared from 3 to 19 August as Ruckly in Sport for Jove's production of One Flew Over the Cuckoo's Nest at the Reginald Theatre in the Seymour Centre, Sydney. Madsen was cast in the world premiere of Muriel's Wedding, portraying Alexander Shkuratov from 6 November 2017 until 27 January 2018.

Madsen returned to the Hayes Theatre as Patrick in the highly successful Australian premiere of the Off-Broadway musical, The View Upstairs which played from 28 February to 11 March 2018.

In August 2018, Madsen portrayed Alan in Darlinghurst Theatre Company's production of Torch Song Trilogy at The Eternity Playhouse.

Madsen was due to perform in the first major Australian production of Sarah Kane's Cleansed in 2021 but the show was postponed due to the COVID-19 pandemic. He appeared as Carl in the rescheduled production in 2022. Earlier that year, he played conniving frenchman Marcel Benoit in the Sydney Theatre Company production of White Pearl by Anchuli Felicia King at the newly renovated Wharf Theatre. He toured with the production to Canberra and Parramatta.

Personal life
Madsen lives in Elizabeth Bay, New South Wales.

Theatre credits

Filmography

Film

Awards and nominations

References

External links

1992 births
Living people
Australian male stage actors
Australian male musical theatre actors
Australian male television actors
Australian gay actors